Sander Risan Mørk (born 6 December 2000) is a Norwegian midfielder who plays for Sandefjord.

Raised in IL Flint, he made his senior debut there in 2016 before joining Sandefjord's youth setup. He made his senior debut here in November 2018, and also played one 2019 Norwegian Football Cup game before being loaned out to IF Fram Larvik. He played the 2020 Eliteserien opener.

References

2000 births
Living people
Sportspeople from Tønsberg
Norwegian footballers
Sandefjord Fotball players
IF Fram Larvik players
Eliteserien players
Association football defenders